Pavliš is a village in Serbia. It is situated in the Vršac municipality, South Banat District, Vojvodina province. The village has a Serb ethnic majority (87.52%) and its population numbering 2,205 people (2011 census).

Name
In Serbian the village is known as Pavliš (Павлиш), in Romanian as Păuliș, in Hungarian as Temespaulis, and in German as Temesch Paulisch.

Historical population

1961: 2,246
1971: 2,188
1981: 2,137
1991: 1,999
2002: 2,237
2002: 2,205

References
Slobodan Ćurčić, Broj stanovnika Vojvodine, Novi Sad, 1996.

See also
List of places in Serbia
List of cities, towns and villages in Vojvodina

Populated places in Serbian Banat
Populated places in South Banat District
Vršac